State Road 542 (NM 542) is a  state highway in the US state of New Mexico. NM 542's southern terminus is at NM 55 north of Tatum, and the northern terminus is at NM 41 north-northwest of Willard.

Major intersections

See also

References

542
Transportation in Torrance County, New Mexico